Clow is an unincorporated community in Hempstead County, Arkansas, United States. It lies approximately 1⅓ miles [2.14 km] from the boundary between Hempstead and Howard counties. Clow is home to the Clow Schools Alumni Association. The main road that goes through this community is Hempstead County Road #37.

Clow is part of the Hope Micropolitan Statistical Area.

References

External links
Map of Clow, Arkansas

Hope micropolitan area
Unincorporated communities in Hempstead County, Arkansas
Unincorporated communities in Arkansas